Nafissatou "Nafi" Thiam (born 19 August 1994) is a Belgian athlete specializing in multi-event competition. She is a two-time Olympic gold medalist, winning the heptathlon event at the 2016 Rio and 2020 Tokyo Olympics. Thiam is the only Belgian athlete, male or female, to successfully defend an Olympic title and only the second woman after Jackie Joyner-Kersee to win back-to-back Olympic titles in the event.

She won the gold medals at the 2017 and 2022 World Championships, and 2018 and 2022 European Championships as well as the silver medal at the 2019 World Championships. Thiam was voted IAAF World Female Athlete of the Year in 2017. She was a Belgian flag bearer at the opening ceremony of the 2020 Tokyo Games.

In May 2017, at the Hypo-Meeting in Götzis, Austria, Thiam became only the fourth woman to break the heptathlon 7000-point barrier. In March 2023, at the European Indoor Championships, on her way to the record third European pentathlon title, she broke the world record set in 2012 at the same Ataköy Arena by Ukraine’s Nataliya Dobrynska, totalling a score of 5055 points (the record was also held for ~six seconds by Adrianna Sułek who finished first the 800 m run). In doing so, Thiam became the first ever Belgian woman to set an official athletics world record (indoor or outdoor).

As of March 2023, Thiam holds the Belgian records in the heptathlon and pentathlon, javelin and long jump (out and indoors). She holds the world record for the high jump discipline within the heptathlon competition, set in 2019.

Career

Junior career

Nafissatou Thiam was born in Brussels to a Belgian mother and Senegalese father. She started participating in athletics when she was seven years old, winning her first national age group titles in 2009, by which time she was already specializing in the heptathlon. Her favorite athlete at the time was Swedish heptathlete Carolina Klüft.

At the 2011 World Youth Championships in Athletics in Lille, France, Thiam finished fourth in the heptathlon with a total of 5366 points. Then, as a first-year junior, she finished 14th at the 2012 World Junior Championships in Athletics in the heptathlon with a total of 5384 points.

On 3 February 2013, Thiam broke the junior world indoor record in the pentathlon at a meeting in Ghent with a total of 4558 points, breaking her personal best in four of the five events. Carolina Klüft, who later became Olympic champion and triple world champion, had held the record since 2002 with 4535 points. In doing so Thiam became the first Belgian female athlete to break a world record. However, in March 2013, the record was not ratified due to a lack of anti-doping control on the day it was achieved. The testing took place the next day, which was beyond the deadline specified by the IAAF, athletics' international governing body.

On 18 July 2013, she won the gold medal in the heptathlon at the European Junior Championships in Rieti, Italy achieving a new Belgian record of 6298 points.

Senior career
In 2014, Thiam won the bronze medal for the heptathlon at the European Athletics Championships staged in Zürich, Switzerland.

In 2015, she won the silver medal in the pentathlon at the European Indoor Championships held in Prague and also claimed silver in the high jump at the European Under-23 Championships in Tallinn, Estonia.

On 13 August 2016, Thiam won the gold medal for the heptathlon at the Olympic Games in Rio de Janeiro with a score of 6810 points, achieving personal best marks in five of the seven disciplines and defeating reigning Olympic and world champion Jessica Ennis-Hill of Great Britain and Northern Ireland. At 21-years-old, she was the youngest Olympic heptathlon gold medalist in history. She was elected Belgian flag bearer at the Olympic closing ceremony.

On 3 March 2017, Thiam won the pentathlon at the 2017 European Indoor Championships in Belgrade with a total of 4870 points.

On 28 May 2017, she won the heptathlon at the Hypo-Meeting in Götzis, Austria with a score of 7013 points, again achieving personal best scores in five of the seven disciplines, making her the fourth woman to score 7000 points or higher in competition. As of July 2017, she was third on the world all-time list behind Jackie Joyner-Kersee of USA and Sweden's Carolina Klüft. Her 59.32m javelin throw in Götzis broke the Belgian record for the women's individual event.

On 6 August 2017, Thiam went into the World Championships in Athletics in London as hot favorite and won the heptathlon world title, becoming the first Belgian to win a World Athletics Championship gold medal.

On 10 August 2018, she won the gold medal at the European Athletics Championships, becoming only the third woman to win Olympic Games, World and European Championships in the heptathlon, after Carolina Klüft and Jessica Ennis-Hill.

On 2 October 2019, she went again into the World Athletics Championships as world leader and favourite for gold, but was expected to face stronger competition than in 2017 from erstwhile rival and 2018 European runner-up, Great Britain's Katarina Johnson-Thompson. In the event, Thiam succumbed to an elbow injury that hindered her javelin, while Johnson-Thompson recorded a huge personal best of 6981 points, a national record and the sixth highest competition score in history to win comfortably. Thiam's performance was still good enough for the silver medal.

On 5 March 2021, she won the pentathlon at the European Indoor Championships in Toruń, Poland with a total of 4904 points.

On 5 August 2021, at the postponed 2020 Tokyo Games, she successfully defended her Olympic title with a score of 6791 points.

At the 2022 World Athletics Championships held in Eugene, Oregon, Thiam claimed her second world gold medal on 18 July with a total of 6947 points.

On 3 March 2023, at the European Indoor Championships in Istanbul, she broke the pentathlon world record set in the same Ataköy Arena back in 2012 by Ukraine’s Nataliya Dobrynska (5013 points), totalling a score of 5055 points. Poland's Adrianna Sułek held also the record for about six and a half second with her score of 5014 points, finishing first the 800 m run, the final of the five events in pentathlon. In addition, with her third European indoor title, Thiam became the most successful female pentathlete in history of this championships.

Training and personal life
Thiam is a member of RFCL Athlétisme, an athletics club operating under the aegis of the Technical and Sports Department of the Royal Football Club de Liège. She was coached by Belgian former decathlete Roger Lespagnard for 14 years but she put an end to their collaboration in October 2022.

Besides being a professional athlete, Thiam studied geography at the University of Liège. "I like climatology, I like geomorphology – how the earth is shaped by rivers. A lot of subjects, like a heptathlon. Maybe that's why I love it." she said. She graduated from university with a bachelor degree in September 2019.

Thiam is a UNICEF Goodwill Ambassador for UNICEF Belgium.

Achievements

All information from World Athletics profile unless otherwise noted.

International competitions

Circuit wins
 Hypo-Meeting: 2017, 2018
 Décastar: 2019
 Diamond League
 2016: Brussels Memorial Van Damme (High jump)
 2018: Brussels (High jump)
 2019: Birmingham Grand Prix (Long jump)

Personal bests

National titles
 Belgian Athletics Championships
 Long jump: 2015, 2018, 2022
 Belgian Indoor Athletics Championships
 60 m hurdles: 2017
 High jump: 2015, 2017
 Long jump: 2016
 Pentathlon: 2016

Honours and awards
 R.F.C.L. Trophy Promising talent: 2010
 Golden Spike award best female talent: 2012
 Golden Spike award: 2013, 2014, 2015, 2016, 2017, 2018, 2019, 2021
 Belgian Promising Talent of the Year: 2013
 Belgian Sportswoman of the Year: 2014, 2016, 2017
 Knight in the : 2014
 European Athletics women's Rising Star of the Year: 2016
 IAAF Female Rising Star of the Year: 2016
 Belgian Sports Merit Award: 2016
 Commander in the Walloon Order of Merit: 2016
 Forbes 30 under 30 for Europe: 2017
 IAAF World Female Athlete of the Year: 2017

In 2017, Thiam officially became UNICEF Ambassador.

References

External links

 
 
 
 
 
 

1994 births
Living people
Sportspeople from Liège
Belgian heptathletes
Belgian female high jumpers
Olympic heptathletes
Olympic athletes of Belgium
Olympic gold medalists for Belgium
Olympic gold medalists in athletics (track and field)
Athletes (track and field) at the 2016 Summer Olympics
Athletes (track and field) at the 2020 Summer Olympics
Medalists at the 2016 Summer Olympics
Medalists at the 2020 Summer Olympics
World Athletics Championships athletes for Belgium
World Athletics Championships winners
European Athletics Championships winners
European Athletics Indoor Championships winners
European Athletics Rising Star of the Year winners
Belgian people of Senegalese descent
Black Belgian sportspeople